"Small Fry" is an American popular song written in 1938 by Hoagy Carmichael and Frank Loesser.  It was first sung and introduced by Bing Crosby, in the film Sing You Sinners (1938).  In the film, Crosby sings it in a musical sequence with a young Donald O'Connor and Fred MacMurray.  
Crosby recorded the song on July 1, 1938  with Johnny Mercer dueting and this reached the No. 3 spot in the charts of the day.  He also recorded a solo version of the song for V-Disc in 1944.

Other versions have been recorded by Mildred Bailey (she reached #9 in the charts in 1938), Al Bowlly (recorded on October 14, 1938 - see Al Bowlly Discography), Crystal Gayle (used in her album Crystal Gayle Sings the Heart and Soul of Hoagy Carmichael), June Christy, and Matt Monro.

There was a Fleischer Studios (direction by Dave Fleischer) animated cartoon in 1939 that used the song "Small Fry" to portray a story behind the song as a warning to youngsters to not want to grow up too quickly.

References

1938 songs
Bing Crosby songs
Mildred Bailey songs
Songs with music by Hoagy Carmichael
Songs written by Frank Loesser
Male vocal duets